Determination is an album by Australian guitarist Tommy Emmanuel. Released in October 1991, the album peaked at number 17 on the ARIA Charts, becoming his second top twenty album. The album was certified platinum in Australia in 1992.

In 1992 the album won the ARIA Award for Best Adult Contemporary Album. It was album nominated for ARIA Award for Best Male Artist but lost to Soul Deep by Jimmy Barnes.

"Stevie's Blues" won Jazz Composition of the Year at the 1992 APRA Music awards.

Track listing

Charts

Certifications

References

1992 albums
ARIA Award-winning albums
Tommy Emmanuel albums
Mega Records albums